Ernest Howard Griffiths (15 June 1851 – 3 March 1932) was a British physicist born in Brecon, Wales. He was elected a Fellow of the Royal Society in 1895 and won its Hughes Medal in 1907.  On his maternal side he was a descendant of the 17th-century admiral Robert Blake.

Griffiths was appointed principal of the University College of South Wales and Monmouthshire, Cardiff in 1901 and given a professorship in experimental philosophy. He was a Fellow of Jesus College, Oxford in 1905, 1909, 1913, and 1917, as part of a system whereby a college fellowship rotated amongst the principals of Welsh university colleges.

References

1851 births
1932 deaths
People from Brecon
Fellows of the Royal Society
Welsh physicists
Academics of Cardiff University
Fellows of Jesus College, Oxford